Vladimir Petrovich Aleynik  (born 12 September 1952) is a Belarusian former diver who competed in the 1976 Summer Olympics and in the 1980 Summer Olympics.

References

External links

1952 births
Living people
People from Smalyavichy
Belarusian male divers
Olympic divers of the Soviet Union
Divers at the 1976 Summer Olympics
Divers at the 1980 Summer Olympics
Olympic silver medalists for the Soviet Union
Olympic bronze medalists for the Soviet Union
Olympic medalists in diving
Medalists at the 1980 Summer Olympics
Medalists at the 1976 Summer Olympics
World Aquatics Championships medalists in diving
Universiade medalists in diving
Universiade gold medalists for the Soviet Union
Universiade bronze medalists for the Soviet Union
Medalists at the 1979 Summer Universiade
Medalists at the 1981 Summer Universiade
Sportspeople from Minsk Region